Joseph Hilarius Eckhel (13 January 1737 – 16 May 1798) was an Austrian Jesuit priest and numismatist.

Biography
Eckhel was born at Enzersfeld, in Lower Austria.

His father was farm-steward to Count Zinzendorf, and he received his early education at the Jesuits' College, Vienna, where at the age of fourteen he was admitted into the order. He devoted himself to antiquities and numismatics. After being engaged as professor of poetry and rhetoric, first at Steyr and afterwards at Vienna, he was appointed in 1772 keeper of the cabinet of coins at the Jesuits' College, and in the same year he went to Italy for the purpose of personal inspection and study of antiquities and coins. At Florence he was employed to arrange the collection of the grand duke of Tuscany; and the first-fruits of his study of this and other collections appeared in his Numi veteres anecdoti, published in 1775.

On the suppression of the Society of Jesus in 1773, Eckhel was appointed by the empress Maria Theresa of Austria professor of antiquities and numismatics at the University of Vienna, and this post he held for twenty-four years. He was in the following year made keeper of the imperial cabinet of coins, and in 1779 appeared his Catalogus Vindobonensis numorum veterum.

Eckhel's main work is the Doctrina numorum veterum, in 8 vols, the first of which was published in 1792, and the last in 1798.

According to the 1911 edition of the Encyclopædia Britannica:

A volume of Addenda, prepared by Steinbuchel from Eckhel's papers after his death, was published in 1826.

Works
Among his other works are:
Choix de pierres gravées du Cabinet Imperial des Antiques (1788)
A school-book on coins entitled Kurzgefasste Anfangsgrunde zur alten Numismatik (1787)
 Doctrina Numorum Veterum. 8 vols. Degen et al., Vienna 1792–1798;
 Part 1: De Numis Urbium, Populorum, Regum. Vol. 1: Continens Prolegomena Generalia, tum Numos Hispaniae, Galliae, Britanniae, Germaniae, Italiae, cum Insulis. Degen, Wien 1792 (Open Access urn:nbn:se:alvin:portal:record-339075);
 Part 1: De Numis Urbium, Populorum, Regum. Vol. 2: Reliquas Europae Regiones cum Parte Asiae Minoris. Degen, Wien 1792 (Open Access urn:nbn:se:alvin:portal:record-339018);
 Part 1: De Numis Urbium, Populorum, Regum. Vol. 3: Reliquam Asiam Minorem, et Regiones deinceps in Ortum sitas. Degen, Wien 1794 (Open Access urn:nbn:se:alvin:portal:record-339342);
 Part 1: De Numis Urbium, Populorum, Regum. Vol. 4: Continens Aegyptum, et Regiones Africae deinceps in occasum sitas. Observata Generalia ad partem I. huius Operis, et Indices in Partem I. Camesina, Wien 1794 (Open Access urn:nbn:se:alvin:portal:record-339013);
 Part 2: De Moneta Romanorum. Vol. 5: Continens Numos Consulares et Familiarum subiectis Indicibus. Camesina, Wien 1795 (Open Access urn:nbn:se:alvin:portal:record-339004);
 Part 2: De Moneta Romanorum. Vol. 6: Continens Numos Imperatorios a Iulio Caesare usque ad Hadrianum eiusque Familiam. Camesina, Wien 1796 (Open Access urn:nbn:se:alvin:portal:record-339040);
 Part 2: De Moneta Romanorum. Vol. 7: Continens Numos Imperatorios ab Antonio Pio usque ad Imperium Diocletiani. Camesina, Wien 1797 (Open Access urn:nbn:se:alvin:portal:record-339054);
 Part 2: De Moneta Romanorum. Vol. 8: Continens Numos Imperatorios, qui supersunt, pseudomonetam, Observata Generalia in Partem II et Indices in Volumina VI VII VIII. Camesina, Wien 1798 (Open Access urn:nbn:se:alvin:portal:record-339044).

See also
Joseph Pellerin

Notes

Sources

Further reading
Daniela Williams, Bernhard Woytek "The scholarly correspondence of Joseph Eckhel (1737-1798): a new source for the history of numismatics", Beiträge zum 6. Österreichischen Numismatikertag 2014 (Hall in Tirol, 14.-16. Mai 2014), Haller Münz-Blätter 8 (2015), pp. 45–56.
 Daniela Williams, Bernhard Woytek "Zoëga studente di numismatica. Il soggiorno a Vienna (1782) e i contatti con Joseph Eckhel", in K. Ascani, P. Buzi, D. Picchi (eds), The Forgotten Scholar: Georg Zoëga (1755‒1809). At the Dawn of Egyptology and Coptic Studies, Leiden ‒ Boston 2015, pp. 101‒110
 Daniela Williams, "Gaetano Marini e Joseph Eckhel tra numismatica ed epigrafia", in M. Buonocore (ed.) Gaetano Marini (1742-1815) protagonista della cultura europea. Scritti per il bicentenario della morte, (Studi e Testi 492-493) Città del Vaticano 2015, pp. 785–796.
 Daniela Williams, "Reflections on the history of numismatic research: exploring the life and work of Joseph Eckhel (1737-1798) through the lens of FINA (Fontes Inediti Numismaticae Antiquae)", in International Numismatic Council INC Compte Rendu 62 (2015), pp. 73‒78.
 Daniela Williams, "Joseph Eckhel and his correspondents from Sicily and the south of Italy: the Prince of Torremuzza (Palermo) and Michele Vargas Macciucca (Naples)", in M. Caccamo Caltabiano et alii XV International Numismatic Congress. Taormina 2015. Proceedings, Roma-Messina 2017, vol. 1, pp. 291–295.
 Daniela Williams, "Charlotte Sophie Bentinck, Joseph Eckhel and numismatics" Virtus. Journal of Nobility Studies 25 (2018), pp. 127–143.
 Daniela Williams, "Joseph Eckhel (1737-1798) and the coin collection of Queen Christina of Sweden in Rome", Journal of the History of Collections 31 (2019).
 Bernhard Woytek, Joseph Eckhel (1737–1798) in Florence and the Making of the Systema Eckhelianum. A New Foundational Text for Ancient Numismatics. In: Journal of the Warburg and Courtauld Institutes 85, 2022, pp. 249–281.
 Bernhard Woytek, Systems, Coin Hoards, Dies and Provenances: Eckhel and the Evolution of Numismatic Method, in: Bernhard Woytek, Daniela Williams (eds): Ars critica numaria. Joseph Eckhel (1737–1798) and the Transformation of Ancient Numismatics, Vienna 2022, pp.641-663 Online
 Bernhard Woytek, Daniela Williams (eds): Ars critica numaria. Joseph Eckhel (1737–1798) and the Transformation of Ancient Numismatics (= Denkschriften der phil.-hist. Klasse der Österreichischen Akademie der Wissenschaften, vol. 541). Austrian Academy of Sciences Press, Vienna 2022, ISBN 978-3-7001-8774-5.Online

External links

1798 deaths
1737 births
People from Baden District, Austria
18th-century Austrian Jesuits
Austrian numismatists
Austrian antiquarians
Academic staff of the University of Vienna